The Men's 1500 metres event at the 2011 European Athletics U23 Championships was held in Ostrava, Czech Republic, at Městský stadion on 16 and 17 July.

Medalists

Results

Final
17 July 2011 / 16:20

Intermediate times:
400m: 1:05.70 Florian Carvalho 
800m: 2:13.18 Florian Carvalho 
1200m: 3:12.08 Florian Carvalho

Heats
Qualified: First 4 in each heat (Q) and 4 best performers (q) advance to the Final

Summary

Details

Heat 1
16 July 2011 / 10:30

Intermediate times:
400m: 59.76 Florian Carvalho 
800m: 1:59.53 Hans Kristian Fløystad 
1200m: 2:59.46 James Shane

Heat 2
16 July 2011 / 10:40

Intermediate times:
400m: 1:00.06 Jeroen D'Hoedt 
800m: 2:03.49 Jeroen D'Hoedt 
1200m: 3:04.57 Jeroen D'Hoedt

Participation
According to an unofficial count, 33 athletes from 19 countries participated in the event.

References

1500 metres
1500 metres at the European Athletics U23 Championships